HMS Halstarr was the Dutch frigate Kenau Hasselar (or Kenau Hasselaar), launched in 1800 that the British captured at Curaçao in 1807.  The Royal Navy took her into service but the Admiralty sold her for breaking up in 1809.

Dutch career
Early in 1802, Kenau Hasselar, under the command of Captain Cornelius (or Cornelis) Hubertus Buschman, was assigned to the East Indies and Cape of Good Hope division of the Navy. After the end of the French Revolutionary Wars, the British ceded the Dutch colonies they had captured in the West Indies to the Batavian Republic. In August 1802, Buschman and Kenau Hasselar took a small squadron that also included the frigate Proserpina, the corvette , the cutter Rose, and the schooner Serpent, to take possession of Curaçao. Kenau Hasellar and Rose arrived at St Anna Bay on 22 December. The other vessels in the squadron sailed to other destinations. Shortly after Kenau Hasellar arrived at Curaçao, an outbreak of yellow fever swept through her that killed Buschman in February 1803, and many of her crew.

On 24 April 1805, HMS Franchise was off Curaçao when she sighted a schooner that anchored under the guns of the fort of Port Maria. Franchise sailed in and fired on the fort and on the schooner for an hour before Franchise could cut the schooner out. The schooner turned out to be a tender to Kenau Hasselar. The schooner had a crew of a lieutenant and 35 men, but a number escaped ashore, leaving behind 24 of their wounded compatriots, as well as the surgeon and the lieutenant. Franchise had one man seriously wounded and two men slightly wounded. The schooner was carrying lumber and rice.

Capture, British service, & Fate
The Dutch naval forces, under the command of Commandant Cornelius J. Evertz of Kenau Hasselar, resisted. Aboard Kenau Hasselar five men were killed, including Evertz, and one man was wounded. In 1847 the Admiralty authorized the issue of the Naval General Service Medal with clasp "Curacoa 1 Jany. 1807" to any surviving claimants from the action; Sixty-five medals were issued.

The British commissioned Kenau Hasselar as Halstarr at Jamaica under Captain John Parrish. She was broken up in 1809.

Note

Citations

References
 
Rotterdams jaarboekje (1900). Historisch Genootschap Roterodamum. (W. L. & J. Brusse).
 

Frigates of the Royal Navy
1800 ships
Captured ships
Ships built in Rotterdam